Nduguti is an administrative ward in the Mkalama District of the Singida Region of Tanzania. According to the 2002 census, the ward has a total population of 15,955. According to the 2012 census, the population had decreased to 8,638.

References

Wards of Singida Region